George Whelan (born 1934), is a male former boxer who competed for England.

Boxing career
He represented England in the -60 kg division at the 1954 British Empire and Commonwealth Games in Vancouver, Canada.

He was the 1954 Amateur Boxing Association British lightweight champion, when boxing out of the Army BC.

References
 

1934 births
English male boxers
Boxers at the 1954 British Empire and Commonwealth Games
Living people
Lightweight boxers
Commonwealth Games competitors for England